Wilcox is a village in the Canadian province of Saskatchewan within the Rural Municipality of Bratt's Lake No. 129 and Census Division No. 6. It is approximately 41 kilometres (25 mi) south of the City of Regina.

Wilcox is the home of the Athol Murray College of Notre Dame, a boarding school for students in grades 9-12. The village is also home to the Notre Dame Hounds ice hockey team in the Saskatchewan Junior Hockey League.

History 
In 1902, the post office formed in the Provisional District of Assiniboia West of the North West Territories and a federal electoral district then named Qu'Appelle. Saskatchewan became a province in 1905. Wilcox incorporated as a village on April 20, 1907.

A one-room school house named Wilcox School District #1633 formed at Tsp 13 Rge 21 W of the 2 Meridian.

Demographics 

Notable people

 Jon Cooper, head coach of the NHL Tampa Bay Lightning
 Ralph Goodale, former federal Minister of Public Safety and former Member of Parliament for Regina-Wascana
 Jason Kenney, Premier Of Alberta
 Brothers Nick Metz and Don Metz of the Toronto Maple Leafs both hail from Wilcox.
 Father Athol Murray founder of Notre Dame College of the Prairies, 1919
 Jaden Schwartz (2011 - current) of the NHL Seattle Kraken

In film
 The 1980 film, The Hounds of Notre Dame, was shot in the village.

See also 

 List of communities in Saskatchewan
 Villages of Saskatchewan

References

Villages in Saskatchewan
Bratt's Lake No. 129, Saskatchewan
Division No. 6, Saskatchewan